Screen Gems is a 1984 album by Elkie Brooks comprising Brooks' interpretations of songs from the movies from the 1920s and 1930s.  The album's title references all of the selections being introduced, or prominently featured, in mid-20th century movie releases.

Background
Screen Gems had its release October 1, 1984 on CD: vinyl and cassette versions of the album were issued a month into its release. Brooks' label A&M Records assigned marketing of Screen Gems to EMI who had recently set up a "television exploitation" department, a national televised advertising campaign commencing at the end of October 1984 when the album had its release in vinyl and cassette formats.  It was anticipated that Screen Gems would "prove Brook's biggest seller to date"; however the album failed to chart until December 1984 and was not one of Brooks' most successful albums with a No. 35 peak in the UK Albums Chart - matching that of  Brook's precedent album release Minutes - during an 11-week chart run. With Screen Gems Brooks' association with A&M, who had released all of her seven albums, ended.  The original CD version of Screen Gems is now a collectors' item due to its rarity, selling on eBay for prices in excess of £45.

Track listing 
 "Once in a While" (Michael Edwards, Bud Green)
 "Am I Blue" (Harry Akst, Grant Clarke)
 "That Old Feeling" (Sammy Fain, Lew Brown)
 "Me and My Shadow" (Al Jolson, Dave Dreyer, Billy Rose)
 "Blue Moon" (Richard Rodgers, Lorenz Hart)
 "Some of These Days" (Shelton Brooks)
 "Ain't Misbehavin'" (Fats Waller, Harry Brooks, Andy Razaf)
 "You'll Never Know" (Harry Warren, Mack Gordon)
 "What'll I Do?" (Irving Berlin)
 "My Foolish Heart" (Victor Young, Ned Washington)
 "Love Me or Leave Me" (Walter Donaldson, Gus Kahn)
 "Three O'Clock In the Morning" (Julián Robledo, Dorothy Terriss)

Single releases 
 "Once in a While" (1984)

Personnel 
Elkie Brooks – vocals
London Philharmonic Orchestra – orchestra
Tony Clark – producer, engineer
Bill Martin – executive producer

References

1984 albums
A&M Records albums
EMI Records albums
Elkie Brooks albums